Choreutis flavimaculata is a species of moth of the family Choreutidae. It is found in the Republic of Congo, Central African Republic and Tanzania.

References

Choreutis
Moths of Africa
Moths described in 1891